Digestible Indispensable Amino Acid Score (DIAAS) is a protein quality method proposed in March 2013 by the Food and Agriculture Organization to replace the current protein ranking standard, the Protein Digestibility Corrected Amino Acid Score (PDCAAS).

The DIAAS accounts for amino acid digestibility at the end of the small intestine, providing a more accurate measure of the amounts of amino acids absorbed by the body and the protein’s contribution to human amino acid and nitrogen requirements. This is in contrast to the PDCAAS, which is based on an estimate of digestibility over the total digestive tract. Values stated using this method generally overestimate the amount of amino acids absorbed.

Reference pattern

Amino acid requirements were determined in two parts. The amino acid distribution of breast milk was used for the 0 to 6 month age range, and existing amino acid data was used for older ages after adjustment for digestibility. The reference amino acid requirements are presented below.

Example values
The table shows the ratings of selected foods comparing PDCAAS to DIAAS.  The quality of various sources of protein depends on how it is processed, refined, stored, or cooked.  (preparation is unspecified for some values in the table, but does not necessarily differ in preparation from the foods where preparation is specified). A major difference between DIAAS and PDCAAS, is that PDCAAS is truncated at 100%, while DIAAS is not. Multiple protein sources can also be combined to increase DIAAS, which can be effective at raising the max DIAAS of plant-based diets.

See also 
 Amino acid score
 Protein Digestibility Corrected Amino Acid Score
 Protein quality
 Net protein utilization
 Nitrogen balance

References 

Proteins
Nutrition